Povo Livre (lit. Free People) is a Portuguese weekly newspaper published in Portugal.

History and profile
Povo Livre was established shortly after the Portuguese press was freed from censorship on 25 March 1974. The paper is the official organ of the Social Democratic Party and is based in Lisbon.

In the 1970s Rui Machete served as the editor of the weekly.

References

External links
On-line editions of 'Povo Livre'
Official site of the social democratic party

1974 establishments in Portugal
Newspapers published in Lisbon
Portuguese-language newspapers
Publications established in 1974
Social Democratic Party (Portugal)
Weekly newspapers published in Portugal